The ARIA Music Award for Music Teacher of the Year, is a popular-voted award presented at the annual ARIA Music Awards, "to recognise music teachers for their passion and hard work in providing Australian children with a better education and the chance to play and enjoy music." The category was first presented in 2017, four short-listed nominees were announced in October and public voting determined the winner in late November. The teacher's educational institute is acknowledged in the announcement of the winner.

Winners and nominees

In the following table, the winner is highlighted in a separate colour, and in boldface; the nominees are those that are not highlighted or in boldface.

References

External links

Music Teacher of the Year